Jazin or Jezin may refer to:
 Jazin, Fars
 Jazin, Kerman
 Jezin, Mazandaran
 Jazin, Razavi Khorasan
 Jazin Rural District, in Razavi Khorasan Province